Santa Maria della Misericordia may refer to:

 Abbazia della Misericordia, Venice
 Santa Maria della Misericordia, Correggio
 Santa Maria della Misericordia, Falconara Marittima